Ivan Bakaidov (born 6 October 1998, Sankt-Peterburg, Russia) is a Russian programmer and blogger.

Biography 
Bakaidov was born in 1998 in St. Petersburg, Russia.

2017 - presented his developments at the UN summit in Istanbul.

2018 - nominee for the UN World Summit Awards.

2019 - included in the list of 50 most famous people of St. Petersburg.

2020 - included in the list of nominees for the thirty most promising Russians under 30 years of age by Forbes.

Bakaidov is developer of a group of applications for people with speech impairments LINKa.

References

Sources 
 Large interview The Village
 Profile The Forbes
 Меняя систему. Как панк, гик и программист с ДЦП помогает людям общаться // ТАСС, 24 мая 2018

1998 births
Living people
Russian computer programmers
Russian bloggers